Park Bridge is an area of Ashton-under-Lyne, Greater Manchester, England.

Park Bridge may also refer to:
 Park Bridge railway station, Greater Manchester
 Park Bridge (British Columbia), a highway bridge
 Park Bridge, Aberdeenshire, a pedestrian and cycle bridge
 Parkbridge, a village in County Wicklow, Ireland